NKG2-F type II integral membrane protein is a protein that in humans is encoded by the KLRC4 gene.

Natural killer (NK) cells are lymphocytes that can mediate lysis of certain tumor cells and virus-infected cells without previous activation. They can also regulate specific humoral and cell-mediated immunity. NK cells preferentially express several calcium-dependent (C-type) lectins, which have been implicated in the regulation of NK cell function. KLRC4 is a member of the NKG2 group which are expressed primarily in natural killer (NK) cells and encodes a family of transmembrane proteins characterized by a type II membrane orientation (extracellular C terminus) and the presence of a C-type lectin domain. The NKG2 gene family is located within the NK complex, a region that contains several C-type lectin genes preferentially expressed on NK cells. The 3' end of the KLRC4 transcript includes the first non-coding exon found at the 5' end of the adjacent D12S2489E gene transcript.

References

Further reading